Louis Kalish (July 10, 1897 – March 4, 1966) was an American politician who served in the New York State Assembly from 1947 to 1966.

References

1897 births
1966 deaths
Democratic Party members of the New York State Assembly
20th-century American politicians